The Halloween Massacre (also known as the Three Day War) was an armed conflict between supporters of UNITA and the MPLA that took place from October 30 to November 1, 1992 in Luanda, Angola. The conflict occurred as a result of UNITA breaking the Bicesse Accords, on account of alleged voter fraud in the 1992 Angolan general elections, resulting in a number of armed MPLA supporters and police around Luanda harassing and murdering a significant number of opposition party supporters. Thousands of UNITA supporters are estimated to have been murdered.

Context

The Angolan Civil War 

Since independence from Portugal in 1975, Angola had been in a civil war between the MPLA and UNITA. The Marxist-Leninist MPLA received direct support from Cuba with the backing of the Soviet Union and other communist states, whilst the UNITA sold itself as an anti-communist organization and received direct military support from South Africa with help from the United States. Ferocious combat was waged during this time period but neither side was able to claim total victory over the other. As the Cold War began to draw to a close, Cuba and South Africa withdrew their troops from the conflict, forcing the MPLA and UNITA into negotiating a political settlement to the conflict.

The Bicesse Accords 

From 1 May 1991, UNITA and MPLA forces agreed on a framework to begin establishing peace in Angola between the two parties. This framework evolved into the Bicesse Accords, signed by the People's Republic of Angola and UNITA on 31 May 1991 in Lisbon, Portugual. The United States and the USSR acted as observers, while Portugual mediated the talks. The accords set out a timetable and established certain conditions that each side agreed to meet by the specified dates. There were three key parts of the agreement; the beginning of a ceasefire (with the initial stages taking effect at the beginning of May and entering into force upon the signing of the accords), the integration of UNITA forces into the Angolan armed forces (which was to occur upon the implementation of the cease fire agreement and had numerous provisions to establish the non-partisan nature of the armed forces), and a nationwide democratic election, which was to take place between the 1st of September to the 30th of November 1992.

1992 Angolan general election 

The 1992 elections took place from 29 September 1992 to 30 September 1992. The MPLA claimed victory in these elections, taking roughly fifty-three percent of the vote and gaining one hundred and twenty nine seats in the legislature whereas UNITA claimed thirty four percent of the vote and gained seventy seats. For the presidency, José Eduardo dos Santos of the MPLA received forty-nine percent of the vote compared to UNITA Savimbi's forty percent. Despite having a higher percentage of the vote, dos Santos was just under the fifty percent majority required to be reelected. Because neither the MPLA nor UNITA obtained the required absolute majority of the presidential election, a follow-up election was necessary according to the constitution. Savimbi, in spite of the UN mission's declaration that the elections were generally free and fair, claimed that the government had rigged the elections, and began pulling UNITA's soldiers out of the new unified Angolan armed forces.

Massacre
The MPLA attacked UNITA positions in Luanda on October 30th. According to some reports, the violence had been planned over the course of weeks. Reports from residents of Luanda's suburbs claimed that "...arms were being distributed locally to government supporters and to former members of the security forces and militia", as well as  reports that "police stations served as centres of distribution". UNITA supporters were targeted in house to house searches by both police and armed government supporters, with some supporters possessing lists of local UNITA supporters who were to be rounded up. Some were summarily executed while others were taken to police stations and later released, though often after being beaten. Some people disappeared completely, with some human rights reports detailing accounts of security forces carrying out executions of suspected UNITA supporters.

Many of the targeted were of the Ovimbundu and Bakongo ethnic groups, which were the main supporters of the UNITA and considered to be potentially disloyal. Other opposition parties that supported UNITA's claim that the 1992 election results were illegitimate were also targeted. This included the Partido Social Democrata Angolano (PSDA), Angolan Social Democratic Party, Partido Democrático para o Progresso-Aliança Nacional Angolana (PDP-ANA), Democratic Progress Party/Angolan National Alliance and the Convenção Nacional Democrática de Angola (CNDA), Angolan National Democratic Convention.

Results

Several leading officials from UNITA were killed in the massacre, including the UNITA Vice President Jeremias Chitunda, negotiator Elias Salupeto Pena and party secretary Aliceres Mango. The total number of casualties ranges, with some sources saying the deaths numbered as high as 30,000.

References

Events in Luanda
Massacres of the Angolan Civil War
Massacres in 1992
1992 in Angola
20th century in Luanda